Quilago (1485–1515) was a chieftainess or queen regnant of the Cochasquí in Ecuador, famed for her defense of the Cochasquí against the expansion of the Inca Empire.

She was a chieftainess or queen of the Cochasquí around the city of Tabacundo in Ecuador. From 1513 to 1515, she defended her chiefdom against the expansionism of the Inca Empire under Huayna Capac. She was finally defeated and placed under house arrest in her city in 1515. She was possibly placed in the harem of the Inca after her defeat and has been singled out as one of the possible mothers of the Inca Atahualpa, Huayna Capac's heir, although this has never been confirmed. According to legend, she attempted to murder the Inca by setting a trap; however, he was alerted to her plans by spies and instead he had her thrown down the trap she had set for him.

References

Becker, Marc; Tutillo, Silvia (2009). Historia agraria y social de Cayambe. Quito: FLACSO / Ediciones Abya-Yala. p. 22. . Consultado el 8 de junio de 2015.

Inca Empire people
15th-century births
Women in 16th-century warfare
Women in war in South America
16th-century women rulers
1485 births
1515 deaths
Native American women in warfare
Nobility of the Americas